John Bedell-Sivright was a Scottish rugby union player.

He also played for Cambridge University RFC.

He was the brother of David Bedell-Sivright who was also capped for Scotland, and who is considered one of the great Scotland players of all time.

References
 Bath, Richard (ed.) The Scotland Rugby Miscellany (Vision Sports Publishing Ltd, 2007 )

Scottish rugby union players
Scotland international rugby union players